The World Fencing Championships is an annual competition in fencing organized by the Fédération Internationale d'Escrime (FIE; International Fencing Federation in English). Contestants may participate in foil, épée, and sabre events.

History
The FIE first organized an international fencing championship in Paris, France in 1921. The competition in its early years was named the European Championships (Championnats d'Europe), and the initial participants were members of the fencing federations of the FIE. In 1921, the only event was men's épée individual. In 1922 and 1923, men's sabre individual was also held. In 1925, only men's sabre individual was held. Since 1926, men's individual events have been held in all three weapons: épée, foil, and sabre. In 1929, women's foil was added to the program as well as a men's foil team event. Men's épée and sabre teams were added in 1930 and women's foil team in 1932. Women's épée individual and team events were added in 1988, and women's sabre individual and team in 1999.

After the 1936 Olympics, the government of Benito Mussolini in Italy offered national recognition and privileges to winners of Olympic or world titles, but not European titles. The Italian fencing federation requested that the FIE change the name of the European Championships to World Championships (Championnats du Monde). The FIE approved this request and gave retroactive World Championship status to the previous European Championships.

Since 1921, the FIE championships have occurred annually except for an interruption forced by World War II from 1939 to 1946, and in some of the years when the Summer Olympics are held. The fencing competitions at the Summer Olympics have served as the World Championships of the year for the relevant events. Since 1932, World Championships have been held during the Olympic years only for those events not being held during that year's Summer Olympics. For the years 1932, 1936, 1948, 1952, and 1956, World Championships were held only in Women's Foil Team since that event was not on the Olympic program during those years. After this event was added to the Olympic program beginning with the 1960 Olympics, the FIE stopped holding World Championships during the Olympic years until 1988 when women's épée individual and women's épée team events were added to the World Championship program, but the IOC declined to add these events to the Olympic program. A World Championship in these two events was again held in 1992 for the same reason. Finally, in 1996 the IOC added these two events to the Olympic program, and the FIE again stopped holding a World Championship in an Olympic year.

When the FIE added women's sabre to the World Championships in 1999, the IOC refused to add these two events to the 2000 Olympic program and so the FIE held a World Championships in only women's sabre in 2000. For the 2004 Olympics, the IOC allowed women's sabre to be contested at the Olympics but only under the condition that the number of fencing events being contested (individual and team) remain at ten. The FIE reluctantly agreed to this condition, and has satisfied it by not contesting two of the team events at the Olympics but holding World Championships for them instead during those years. So World Championships have been held but Olympic events have not been held (2004–16) for the following events:
2004 – women's foil team, women's sabre team
2008 – men's foil team, women's épée team
2012 – men's épée team, women's sabre team
2016 – men's sabre team, women's foil team

From 2020 Summer Olympics, all 12 fencing events were held, which means no World Championships are held on Olympic years.

Naming
These World Fencing Championships are usually referred to as Senior World Fencing Championships because the FIE also runs three other World Championships. Beginning in 1950, the FIE also sanctioned an annual competitions which it originally called the Junior World Criterium (Criterium Mondial des Jeunes). Entries were originally restricted to those 21 years of age or lower, but in 1960 the age limit was dropped to 20. In 1964, the name of the competition was officially changed to Junior World Championships, and world championship status was retroactively granted to the participants of the previous competitions.

Beginning in 1987, the FIE began sanctioning an annual competition called the Cadet World Championships. Entries were restricted to those 17 years of age or lower. Originally the Junior and Cadet World Championships were held in different cities on different dates, but beginning in 1993 they've been called the Junior/Cadet World Championships and have been held at the same venue with all of the cadet events held first followed by all of the junior events.

Beginning in 1997, the FIE began sanctioning an annual competition called the Veteran World Championships. Entries were restricted to those 40 years of age or older the first year, and 50 years or older in subsequent years.

Hosts

Hosting tally
Hosting nations 1921–2022

Medal table
This table has been last updated after the 2022 World Fencing Championships. This counts the medals from the World Championships since 1921, and does not include the results of the fencing competitions at the Summer Olympics.

World champions

Épée

Foil

Sabre

Multiple gold medalists
Boldface denotes active fencers and highest medal count among all fencers (including these who not included in these tables) per type. The numbers in brackets denotes number of medals earned at the unofficial World Championships in 1921–1936 (known as European Championships back then) which are counted in overall statistics.

Men

All events

Individual events

Women

All events

Individual events

See also

Fencing at the Summer Olympics
Junior World Fencing Championships
Fencing World Cup

References

Sources

External links
Official site of FIE

 
Fencing competitions
Fencing
Recurring sporting events established in 1921